Hubli Taluka is a taluka located in Dharwad District of the Indian state of Karnataka.

Village name & Code
 A. Timmasagar 602385
 Adargunchi 602410
 Agadi 602431
 Amargol 602374
 Anchatgeri 602406
 B. Aralikatti 602427
 Belegali 602418
 Bengeri 602378
 Bhairidevarakop 602375
 Bhandiwad 602394
 Bommapur 602384
 Bommasamudra 602422
 Budarsingi 602408
 Byahatti 602389
 Channapur 602413
 Chavargudd 602414
 Chebbi 602426
 Devargudihal 602402
 Gabbur 602386
 Gangiwal 602405
 Giriyal 602417
 Gokul 602383
 Gopankop 602377
 Halyal 602396
 Hebsur 602390
 Inam-Veerapur 602416
 Ingalhalli 602393
 Kamplikop 602425
 Karadikop 602423
 Katnur 602412
 Keshawpur 602380
 Kirasur 602391
 Koliwad 602400
 Kotgondhunshi 602409
 Kurdikeri 602424
 Kusugal 602392
 Malligwad 602401
 Mantur 602395
 Mavanur 602407
 Murarhalli 602411
 Nagarhalli 602397
 Nagashettikop 602379
 Nulvi 602419
 Pale 602421
 Palikop 602429
 Parasapur 602403
 Ramapur 602415
 Rayanal 602404
 Revadihal 602382
 Sgerewad 602420
 Shirguppi 602398
 Sulla 602388
 Tarihal 602381
 Tirumalkoppa 602430
 Umachigi 602399
 Unkal 602376
 Warur 602428
 Yellapura 602387

Taluks of Karnataka
Geography of Dharwad district